Living campaigns, or shared campaigns, are a gaming format within the table-top role-playing game community that provide the opportunity for play by an extended community within a shared universe. In contrast to traditional isolated role-playing games, living campaigns allow and encourage players to develop characters that can be played at games run by many different game masters, but which share a game world and campaign setting, as well as a plot line that is overseen by a central core of professional or volunteer editors and contributors. Many living campaigns serve a dual role of providing a creative outlet for highly involved volunteer contributors while also serving as a marketing tool for the publisher of the game system that is the focus of the living campaign. While the earliest living campaigns were run by the now defunct RPGA (Role Playing Gamer's Association), many groups around the world run active living campaigns which are independent or sponsored by other publishers.

Overview

Living campaigns are a shared campaign setting with a codified set of rules for the campaign that govern how to build and advance characters as well as how the campaign will handle rules elements of the setting. Campaign staff create, distribute, and manage new adventures in that campaign setting, and quite often administer a player database and promote various products. A living campaign lets players build and advance characters, develop their personalities, and forge relationships. Living campaign games are run at conventions, game days and other gatherings. The rules for character tracking allow a player to take their PC they created for the campaign to any of these gatherings and play it in the adventures offered. It is still common for adventures to be offered at conventions with premade characters that fit to the story, but Living campaigns allow for additional options.

The original living campaign was the Living City, set in the Forgotten Realms city of Ravens Bluff, and created by the RPGA. The campaign ran in its original form in Polyhedron magazine starting in the mid-1980s, and continued until shortly after the advent of 3rd Edition Dungeons & Dragons (D&D) in 2000. It then restarted under the auspices of the company Organized Play, but lasted only two years under that license and then reverted in 2003 to Wizards of the Coast. Living City proved to be a popular concept and "the number of Living City events actually surpassed the 'classic' RPGA tournaments — possibly as early as late 1993". In the first decade of the twenty-first century, RPGA created a variety of living campaigns. The largest was Living Greyhawk, played by thousands of people around the world from 2000 to 2008.

Organized play programs 
Shared campaigns have occurred for multiple role-playing games:

References 

Dungeons & Dragons campaign settings
Eberron
Forgotten Realms